Orta Yeməzli (also, Orta Yemazlu or Orta Yemezli) is a village in the Zangilan Rayon of Azerbaijan.

References 

Populated places in Zangilan District